Chionodes mikkolai is a moth in the family Gelechiidae. It is found in North America, where it has been recorded in the Yukon.

References

Chionodes
Moths described in 1999
Moths of North America
Endemic fauna of Yukon
Endemic fauna of Canada